The 1992 Big South Conference baseball tournament  was the postseason baseball tournament for the Big South Conference, held from May 8 through 14, 1992, with the first round hosted by the higher seed and subsequent rounds at Charles Watson Stadium home field of Coastal Carolina in Conway, South Carolina.  All eight teams participated in the double-elimination tournament. The champion, won the title for the third time and second consecutive year.

Format
All eight teams qualified for the tournament.  The first round consisted of best-of-three series, with the winners advancing to a four-team, double-elimination tournament.

Bracket and results

All-Tournament Team

Most Valuable Player
Paul Leszcznski was named Tournament Most Valuable Player.  Leszcznski was an outfielder for Coastal Carolina.

References

Tournament
Big South Conference Baseball Tournament
Big South baseball tournament
Big South Conference baseball tournament